= O2 Arena =

O2 Arena may refer to:

- The O2 Arena, London
- O2 Arena (Prague), Czech Republic
- The O2 Belfast, Northern Ireland
- 3Arena (Dublin), Ireland, formerly known as The O2

== See also ==
- Uber Arena, Berlin, formerly known as O2 World
- Barclays Arena, Hamburg, formerly known as O2 World Hamburg
